Tubbercurry or Tobercurry is the second-largest town in terms of both population and land area in County Sligo, Ireland. It lies at the foot of the Ox Mountains, on the N17 national primary road. The village is twinned with Viarmes in France. Tubbercurry achieved status as a Fairtrade town in September 2008.

History
The earliest mention of Tubbercurry is from 1397 when a battle took place in the town between two O’Connor families, the O'Conor Don from Roscommon and the O’Conor Sligo from Sligo town. St. Naithí and St Attracta are the patron saints of the area.

Events 
Tubbercurry hosts three annual festivals. These include the South Sligo Summer School of Irish traditional music, song and dance, which is held each year during the second week in July. The Old Fair Day Festival is also held annually in early August, and the Western Drama Festival is held in early March.

Sport 
The local Gaelic football and hurling club is Tubbercurry GAA. Real Tubber F.C. are a local association football club, and South Sligo A.C. is a local athletics club. There is a golf course on the town's edge, named Tubbercurry Golf Club. Other sports are also catered for including badminton, handball and karate.

Education 
Tubbercurry is home to Saint Attracta's Community School, which was opened after the merger of Banada Abbey Secondary School and the Marist Convent. St. Attracta's C.S. was opened in November 2002. The town is also home to Holy Family and Drimina National Schools.

Transport
Public transport to the town is provided with a bus service which connects Tubbercurry with Galway, Sligo, Castlebar, Westport and Tuam, as well as services to nearby Ireland West Airport. The town also has a number of private bus and hackney hire companies.

The former Tubbercurry railway station, which first opened in October 1895, was closed for passenger traffic on 17 June 1963 and closed altogether on 3 November 1975.

The reopening of the Western Rail Corridor would restore the service in the future.

Notable people
 Michael Fingleton, former chief executive of Irish Nationwide Building Society and key figure in the Irish financial crisis
 Tadhg Dall Ó hÚigínn, noted sixteenth-century bardic poet, was a powerful figure in Tubbercurry.

See also
 List of towns and villages in Ireland

References

External links 

 Town's Official Website

Towns and villages in County Sligo